The H-class was a class of ten trams built by Duncan & Fraser, Adelaide for the Prahran & Malvern Tramways Trust (PMTT). All passed to the Melbourne & Metropolitan Tramways Board on 2 February 1920 when it took over the PMTT becoming the H-class retaining their running numbers. In 1931, number 63 was sold for further use on the Ballarat network and placed in service as number 18.

Preservation
One has been preserved:
63 by the Ballarat Tramway Museum as number 18

References

Melbourne tram vehicles
600 V DC multiple units